Barks may refer to:

 Carl Barks (1901 – 2000) was an American cartoonist, author, and painter 
 Coleman Barks (b. 1937), an American poet, and former literature faculty at the University of Georgia
 Samantha Barks (b. 1990), a Manx actress and singer
 Bark scale, a psychoacoustical scale proposed by Eberhard Zwicker and named after Heinrich Barkhausen

See also 
 Bark (disambiguation)